Ján Hudacký (born on 24 February 1959 in
Vranov nad Topľou)
is a Slovak politician and
Member of the European Parliament with the Krestansko-demokraticke hnutie,
part of the European People's Party and sits on
the European Parliament's Committee on Industry, Research and Energy.

He is a substitute for the Committee on Economic and Monetary Affairs, a member of
the Delegation for relations with Mercosur and a substitute for the
Delegation for relations with Switzerland, Iceland and Norway and to the European Economic Area (EEA) Joint Parliamentary Committee.

Career
 1978-1993: Košice Technical University, Faculty of Electrical Engineering

Education
 1991: Management Consulting Institute (Bratislava)
 1993: Institute of Management for Business (Bratislava)
 1994: Durham University Business School
 1998: Georgetown University (Washington, USA)
 2000: Centre for International Studies (Israel)
 1990-1992: Marketing professional
 1992-1993: Head of a business advisory centre
 1993-2004: Manager of a regional advisory and information centre
 1998-2002: Member of the Council for Socioeconomic Development
 1998-2002: Member of the Financial Committee of the town of Prešov
 since 2002: Member of the Business Committee of the town of Prešov
 since 2001: Member of the Financial Committee of Prešov Autonomous Region
 since 2003: Member of the board of directors of the European Association of Regional Development Agencies (EURADA)
 since 1997: Member of the Microfinance Centre for Central and Eastern Europe (Warsaw)
 1999-2001: President of the Association of Microfinance Institutions of Slovakia
 since 2002: Vice-President of the Association of Christian Entrepreneurs and Managers of Slovakia

See also
 2004 European Parliament election in Slovakia

External links
 
 

1959 births
Living people
People from Vranov nad Topľou
Christian Democratic Movement MEPs
MEPs for Slovakia 2004–2009
MEPs for Slovakia 2009–2014
Members of the National Council (Slovakia) 2012-2016